Samir Abdul-Ridha (born 1 July 1960) is a former Iraqi football goalkeeper who played for Iraq in the 1986 Asian Games. He played for the national team between 1981 and 1986.

References

Iraqi footballers
Iraq international footballers
Living people
1960 births
Association football goalkeepers